Le Reculet is the second-highest peak in the Jura Mountains, with an elevation of 1718 metres. It is located in the Ain department of France. It is a few kilometres south of the Crêt de la Neige on the territory of the town of Thoiry.

The summit has views of the Pays de Gex, Geneva, Lake Geneva, the Alps, Mont Blanc, the Matterhorn, and on clear days the Chaîne des Puys. The inhabitants of Thoiry erected a cross on the summit. 

Le Reculet was designated as the highest point of the Jura, until the elevation of the Crêt de la Neige was remeasured as 1720 m instead of 1717.6 m.

Notes and references

The position of the peak is taken from Géoportail

Mountains of Ain
Mountains of the Jura